Ha-103 may refer to:

 , an Imperial Japanese Navy submarine in commission from February to September 1945
  Nakajima Ha103, an alternative name for the Nakajima Mamoru aircraft engine